Saint-Étienne-sur-Usson (literally Saint-Étienne on Usson; Auvergnat: Sent Estève d’Içon) is a commune in the south-central French department of Puy-de-Dôme, in Auvergne.

It is the setting for the 2002 documentary film To Be and to Have (French: Être et avoir), about the commune's one-room primary school.

See also
Communes of the Puy-de-Dôme department

References

Saintetiennesurusson